Phytoecia vaulogeri is a species of beetle in the family Cerambycidae. It was described by Maurice Pic in 1892. It is known from Algeria. It contains the varietas Phytoecia vaulogeri var. lucasi.

References

Phytoecia
Beetles described in 1892